Milonia is a genus of Southeast Asian orb-weaver spiders first described by Tamerlan Thorell in 1890.

Species
 it contains seven species:
Milonia albula O. Pickard-Cambridge, 1899 – Singapore
Milonia brevipes Thorell, 1890 – Indonesia (Sumatra)
Milonia hexastigma (Hasselt, 1882) – Indonesia (Sumatra)
Milonia obtusa Thorell, 1892 – Singapore
Milonia singaeformis (Hasselt, 1882) – Indonesia (Sumatra)
Milonia tomosceles Thorell, 1895 – Myanmar
Milonia trifasciata Thorell, 1890 – Indonesia (Java, Borneo)

References

Araneidae
Araneomorphae genera
Spiders of Asia
Taxa named by Tamerlan Thorell